Korran (also Romanized as Korrān; also known as Khorram, Khorrān, Khurram, and Kooran) is a village in Saadatabad Rural District, Pariz District, Sirjan County, Kerman Province, Iran. At the 2006 census, its population was 369, in 103 families.

References 

Populated places in Sirjan County